Crackdown may refer to

 Crackdown (web series)
 Crackdown (video game series)
 Crackdown (video game)
 Crackdown 2
 Crackdown 3
 Crackdown (podcast)
 The Crackdown, a 1983 album